The 1986 North Dakota State football team represented North Dakota State University during the 1986 NCAA Division II football season, and completed the 90th season of Bison football. The Bison played their home games at Dacotah Field in Fargo, North Dakota. The 1986 team came off an 11–2–1 record from the previous season. The 1986 team was led by coach Earle Solomonson. The team finished the regular season with an undefeated 10–0 record and made the NCAA Division II playoffs. The Bison defeated the, 27–7, in the National Championship Game en route to the program's second consecutive, and third NCAA Division II Football Championship.

Senior quarterback Jeff Bentrim was awarded the inaugural Harlon Hill Trophy, which honors the best football player in Division II, at the end of the season. Bentrim ended the season with 64 career touchdowns scored, breaking Walter Payton's Division II record of 63.

Schedule

References

North Dakota State
North Dakota State Bison football seasons
NCAA Division II Football Champions
North Central Conference football champion seasons
College football undefeated seasons
North Dakota State Bison football